Arachidic acid, also known as icosanoic acid, is a saturated fatty acid with a 20-carbon chain. It is a minor constituent of cupuaçu butter (7%), perilla oil (0–1%), peanut oil (1.1–1.7%), corn oil (3%), and cocoa butter (1%). The salts and esters of arachidic acid are known as arachidates.

Its name derives from the Latin arachis—peanut. It can be formed by the hydrogenation of arachidonic acid.

Reduction of arachidic acid yields arachidyl alcohol.

Arachidic acid is used for the production of detergents, photographic materials and lubricants.

References

Fatty acids
Alkanoic acids